Cassie Davis (born 1987) is an Australian singer and songwriter from Perth. Her debut album, Differently, was released in 2009.

Biography 
Davis was born in Gnangara, Western Australia, the second child of a family of four. Her father, Steven, is a pastor in Perth. Davis' parents introduced her to music.  Davis recorded her first songs on her home computer at age twelve. In 1999, she did work experience at a local recording studio for three years and learnt how to use mics, song arranging, basic producing and how to make a good recording. Davis then enrolled at the Western Australian Academy of Performing Arts (WAAPA), where she studied sound engineering and production.  In 2003 she travelled to the United States, accompanied by her elder sister, Emma, who handles the business side of their label, 12 Stones.  . Her younger brother, Joseph, plays guitar in her band.

Davis wrote and recorded the majority of her album independently. She also worked with producer Printz Board, producer Rodney Jerkins and songwriter/producer Wayne Wilkins who has already brought her in to work on a number of writing and production projects.

In a 2009 article in Rolling Stone Australia, she describes herself as

Career

2009–present: Differently 

Davis landed a worldwide four-album deal with Sony BMG through her label 12 Stones. Her debut release was the single "Like It Loud" which reached No. 11 on the ARIA singles chart. Davis performed "Like It Loud" on Week 2: Top 18 Results episode of So You Think You Can Dance Australia backed by her band and 50 dancers.

In support of her single "Like It Loud", Davis joined forces with Australian clothing label Supre to create a limited edition T-shirt. Cathy Van Der Meulen said "Cassie is such an exciting new talent and represents everything our brand stands for in an Australian girl...fun, fashionable and forward thinking. Cassie is going to be an Australian icon not unlike Supre."

Her second single "Differently" was released in Australia on 24 April 2009. The music video features Travis McCoy, Printz Board and Fish from Fishbone. The third single, "Do it Again", was co-written by former Australian artist Leah Haywood, and Daniel James and produced under Haywood and James moniker Dreamlab. 'Do it Again' was released digitally and physically on 7 August. Davis' debut album was released 14 August 2009. Cassie Davis' second single "Differently" was certified Gold on 18 September 2009. Confirmed via her Twitter page
Cassie Davis also wrote and appears on Warren G's 2009 album The G Files, with Snoop Dogg on the track "Swagger Rich" which appeared on the final season of Ugly Betty.

Cassie is currently the ambassador for Camp Quality and their new program for high school students "The Teenage Alchemist" which is the children's family cancer charity that believes in bring optimism and happiness to the lives of children and families affected by cancer through fun therapy. "I'm thrilled to be helping Camp Quality spread optimism through high schools and to be involved in educating teenagers about cancer, making positive life choices and peer pressure. I want to encourage people to be strong and stay true to who they are and I think The Teenage Alchemist is a great way to get the message out there", said Cassie.

In early 2010, Cassie wrote a single titled "Choose You" for Stan Walker's second studio album From the Inside Out. 

In 2011, Cassie started a production group called More Mega with fellow writer/producer Snob Scrilla. Together, they wrote and produced Havana Brown's debut single "We Run The Night". The song was released in late April, and was the first Australian track to debut in the top 10 in 2011 and is certified double platinum.  They also produced and wrote Havana browns second single "Get It"

Cassie co-wrote the song "Take Me Away" for Marvin Priest featuring Wynter Gordon.

More recently, they have produced and written the newly released song "All We Have" for X-factor judge Natalie Bassingthwaighte, "Braveheart" and "Welcome to the Jungle"by Neon Jungle, "Running Back" by Jessica Mauboy and "Choose You" by Stan Walker.

Cassie changed her name to Brooklyn Young for a little while during the early 2012, with no music emerging under that name. She now goes by the moniker BABY, and has teamed up with two dudes in Los Angeles to form an electro-pop-house group called CONTRA. They've quietly been doing some small shows around Los Angeles to warm up for their EP, The 90s Are All That, which you'll hear in the Australian Autumn of 2015.

Personal life 
Cassie has been in a relationship with Snob Scrilla since 2009. They welcomed their first child in 2015.

Discography

Studio albums

Singles

Music videos

References 

1987 births
Living people
Musicians from Perth, Western Australia
Australian songwriters
Australian women pop singers
21st-century Australian singers
21st-century Australian women singers